This is a list of notable people who were either born or raised, or have lived for a significant period of time in the Tallahassee, Florida metropolitan area.

Academics, education, and research
Roy Baumeister – psychologist of self-control
Konrad E. Bloch – Nobel Prize-winning biochemist, who helped learn about the functioning of cholesterol
Mark Frederick Boyd - malariologist and writer
James M. Buchanan – winner of Nobel Prize in economics
Talbot "Sandy" D'Alemberte – attorney, civil-rights activist, former dean of the Florida State University Law School, former president of Florida State University, president of the American Bar Association and the American Judicature Society
Paul Dirac – Nobel Prize-winning physicist whose theories predicted antimatter
Sylvia Earle – former chief scientist for the U.S. National Oceanic and Atmospheric Administration
Neil Frank – former director of the National Hurricane Center
Fred Gainous – former president of Florida A & M University, 2002–2004; former chancellor of the Alabama College System's Department of Postsecondary Education; associate vice president of St. Petersburg College
Robert A. Holton – chemist and inventor of Taxol
Tim Howard – president and founder of Cambridge Graduate University international, former head of doctorate program of Law & Policy at Northeastern University, former Assistant Attorney General of Florida
Sir Harold Kroto – Nobel Prize-winning chemist who helped discover fullerenes
Max Mayfield – former director of the National Hurricane Center
Alfred Mele – philosopher of free will
Robert S. Mulliken – physicist and chemist who won both the Priestley Medal and the Nobel Prize
Michel Oksenberg – China scholar, member of National Security Council
X. William Proenza – former director of the National Hurricane Center
Michael Ruse – philosopher, historian of science, noteworthy atheist
Robert Schrieffer – Nobel Laureate, BCS Theory of Superconductivity
E. Lee Spence – underwater archeologist

Space exploration
Carolyn S. Griner – former director of the NASA Marshall Space Flight Center
Winston Scott – NASA astronaut
Norman Thagard – NASA astronaut; flew on three different U.S. Space Shuttles, and on one Russian mission to the Mir space station

Authors
Jesse Bullington – Fantasy novelist; also published as Alex Marshall
Robert Olen Butler – Pulitzer Prize-winning author for A Good Scent from a Strange Mountain (fiction)
Lisa De Pasquale – political writer and columnist
Doug Marlette – Pulitzer Prize-winning cartoonist
Leora Bettison Robinson (1840-1914) – author, educator
Jeff Shaara – New York Times bestselling author of historical fiction
Michael Shaara – Pulitzer prize-winning author (for The Killer Angels)
Jeff VanderMeer – World Fantasy Award-winning author (for the novella The Transformation of Martin Lake)

Aviation
Jerrie Mock – aviator and first woman to fly around the world solo

Business
Wally Amos – founder of the "Famous Amos" chocolate chip cookie brand; actor
Eugene Figg – engineer for such bridges as Sunshine Skyway Bridge, Linn Cove Viaduct, and Natchez Trace Parkway Bridge
Robert B. Hilton – Tallahassee newspaper owner and Confederate congressman during the American Civil War

Film, television, and radio
Red Barber – sportscaster, Radio Hall of Fame member
Jim Cramer – host of CNBC's Mad Money

Acting
Kay Aldridge – model and actress
Matt Battaglia – actor and former NFL player
Cathy Jenéen Doe – actress
Brad Davis – actor (Midnight Express, Querelle)
Kyan Douglas – the "grooming expert" from Queer Eye for the Straight Guy
Faye Dunaway – actress, Academy Award winner for Network
Tony Hale – actor, played Byron "Buster" Bluth on Arrested Development
Cheryl Hines – actress, two-time Emmy nominee for Curb your Enthusiasm, director, married to Robert F. Kennedy, Jr.
Polly Holliday – actress, Golden Globe winner (for television series Alice)
Will Kirby – Big Brother 2 (2001) winner
Christine Lahti – film actress and director, winner of Academy Award for Leiberman in Love, two Golden Globes and Emmy for Chicago Hope
Burt Reynolds – Emmy and Golden Globe Award-winning, Oscar-nominated actor, attended FSU
Anika Noni Rose – Tony Award-winning actress, as Emmie Thibodeaux in Caroline, or Change
Sonny Shroyer – actor who played deputy sheriff on The Dukes of Hazzard
Roy Wood, Jr. – comedian and actor on The Daily Show

Writing and production
Jim Butterworth – documentary filmmaker, winner of DuPont-Columbia Award for Seoul Train
Ron J. Friedman – writer of Disney's Academy Award-nominated film Brother Bear

Government and politics
Art Agnos – former mayor of San Francisco, California
Reubin Askew – politician, former governor of Florida
Bobby Brantley – lieutenant governor of Florida 1987–1991
Lawton Chiles – politician and FSU research fellow; former US Senator and Governor of Florida
LeRoy Collins – politician and Governor of Florida; the only Tallahassee native to serve as Florida's governor
Parris Glendening – former Governor of Maryland
Carla Hayden – 14th Librarian of Congress
Scott Maddox – former mayor of Tallahassee 
John Marks – Mayor of Tallahassee 2003-2014
Kenneth Minihan – former director of the National Security Agency
Nell Foster Rogers – lobbyist
Orson Swindle – commissioner of the Federal Trade Commission
Gregory Tony (born 1978) – Sheriff of Broward County, Florida
Craig Waters – spokesman for the Florida Supreme Court

Historical people
Catherine Willis Gray Murat – great-grandniece of George Washington
Prince Achille Murat – nephew of Napoleon Bonaparte
Charles Kenzie Steele – clergyman and civil rights activist
Ernest I. Thomas – raiser of the original flag at Iwo Jima

Infamy
Marshall Ledbetter – protester who took over the Florida capitol building

Music
Cannonball Adderley – jazz alto saxophone player, Grammy Award winner
Nat Adderley – jazz cornet and trumpet player
Ethel Cain (Hayden Anhedönia) – singer-songwriter, artist
Ray Charles – popular blues vocalist and pianist
George Clinton – musician, founder of Funk bands Parliament and Funkadelic
Rita Coolidge – Grammy Award-winning singer,  "From the Bottle to the Bottom" and "Lover Please"
Janice Harsanyi – vocalist and teacher
Kenny Howes – rock musician
K. Michelle (born Kimberly Michelle Pate) – reality TV personality and R&B singer
Jim Morrison – lead singer and lyricist of The Doors
Marcus Roberts – jazz pianist
T-Pain (born Faheem Najm) – hip hop and R&B singer
Butch Trucks (Claude Hudson Trucks) – drummer, member of the Allman Brothers band

Composition
Creed – rock band formed in Tallahassee
Carlisle Floyd – opera composer,  Susannah (1955) and others
Marcus Roberts – jazz pianist, composer and music professor at Florida State University
Morgan Sorne – singer-songwriter
Ernst von Dohnányi – composer and pianist
Ellen Taaffe Zwilich – Pulitzer prize-winning composer (for Three Movements for Orchestra (Symphony No. 1))

Sports
David Ross (baseball) – MLB catcher
Robert "Bobby" C. Bowden – college football coach, winner of two national championships
Ricky Carmichael – motocross/supercross champion
Kevin Carter – NFL defensive end
Bradley Cooper – member of 1984 and 1988 Bahamas Summer Olympics team
Gene Cox – State of Florida Sports Hall of Fame member (Leon High School football coach)
Antonio Cromartie – NFL player credited with the longest play in NFL history
Kim Crosby – NASCAR driver, with a best race finish of 20th, in 2004
Dwight F. Davis – founder of the international tennis Davis Cup
Walter Dix – U.S. track team member and medalist at 2008 Beijing Olympics
Warrick Dunn – FSU and NFL football star
Carrie Englert (Zimmerman) – member of 1976 U.S. Summer Olympics team
Corey Fuller – played for FSU's football team, later became a wide receiver for the Vikings, Browns and Ravens
Michael Gaines – tight end for the Detroit Lions
DaVanche (Ron) Galimore – member of 1980 U.S. Summer Olympics team
Willie Galimore – member of College Football Hall of Fame, and NFL football player
William Gay – NFL cornerback for the Pittsburgh Steelers
Althea Gibson – winner of several Wimbledon and US Open tennis championships
Frances C. Griscom – U.S. Women's amateur golf champion
Ken Harnden – hurdler and sprinter who represented Zimbabwe in the 1996 and 2000 Olympic Games
Tahesia Harrigan – professional sprinter (BVI)
Bob Hayes – sprinter and gold medal winner on 1964 U.S. Summer Olympics team; NFL football wide receiver for Dallas Cowboys
Missy Hyatt – professional wrestling valet and commentator for World Championship Wrestling and Extreme Championship Wrestling
Taylor Jacobs – professional football player, wide receiver with Washington Redskins, San Francisco 49ers, and Denver Broncos
Marty Jannetty – professional wrestler, best known for his work with WWE
Reggie Jefferson – MLB player
Brad Johnson – NFL quarterback
Brandy Johnson – member of 1988 U.S. Summer Olympics team
Desmond Koh – amateur swimmer who represented Singapore in the 1988, 1992, and 1996 Olympic Games
Nevin McCaskill – NFL player for the Green Bay Packers
Mike "11" Martin – All-Time winningest coach in NCAA Division I College Baseball; 2019 inductee in National College Baseball Hall of Fame
Michelle McCool – World Wrestling Entertainment diva (formally Diva Champion)
Fondren Mitchell – football player
Brian Olson – member of 1996, 2000 and 2004 U.S. Summer Olympics teams
Burgess Owens – professional football player, member of Oakland Raider team that won Super Bowl XV
Bill Peterson – college and NFL head football coach
Zach Piller – NFL guard for the Tennessee Titans
Don Pumphrey, Jr – offensive tackle for the Tampa Bay Buccaneers
Elise Ray – gymnast, represented United States in 2000 Olympic Games
Gabrielle Reece – professional volleyball player, model
Deion Sanders – FSU football star, NFL cornerback, Major League Baseball outfielder, NFL Network commentator
Ernie Sims – NFL linebacker
Dwight Smith – MLB outfielder
Bobby Thigpen – MLB relief pitcher and coach
Craphonso Thorpe – NFL wide receiver
Marion Tinsley – world checkers champion 1955–58, 1975–91
Charlie Ward – 1993 Heisman Trophy winner
Pat Watkins – NFL safety for the Dallas Cowboys
Chris Weinke – 2000 Heisman Trophy winner
Boo Williams – NFL tight end for the New Orleans Saints
Jameis Winston – 2014 Heisman winner and quarterback for the Tampa
Woody Woodward – MLB shortstop - Braves, Reds; FSU Baseball Head Coach (1975–78); MLB GM - Yankees, Phillies, Mariners
Wally Williams – NFL (1993-2003) Cleveland Browns, Baltimore Ravens, and New Orleans Saints (First Franchise Player in Ravens History)

Visual arts
Karl Zerbe – expressionist painter using the encaustic painting technique

References

Tallahassee, Florida
Tallahassee